Ray Gallardo is an American film director and cinematographer known for his direction of Cafe Con Leche, Callejero, Above the Tin, Entrenched: Prologue and his cinematography in Friend of the World and The Fifth of November.

Career 
In 2015, Gallardo's film Callejero, an underground fighting drama film featuring Carlos Palomino and Yaqui López, screened at the San Diego Latino Film Festival. His next film Cafe Con Leche, starring Gerardo Teracena and Nina Senicar, was listed in the product guide for Screen International at Toronto International Film Festival in 2017 and premiered at ArcLight Hollywood in 2018. Gallardo directed Above the Tin, a 2018 film made in San Diego about squash among underprivileged teens. In 2019, he was the cinematographer for The Fifth of November, a film starring Qurrat Ann Kadwani that is about the emotional distress from mass shootings. Gallardo directed Entrenched: Prologue, a PTSD awareness film that premiered at San Diego International Film Festival and was nominated for Best Art Design at Oceanside International Film Festival. In 2020, Gallardo handled the cinematography for Friend of the World. Film critics praised his lensing and use of lighting. Director Brian Patrick Butler said Gallardo's use of lighting was crucial for classic black and white photography. Gallardo’s production company Infrastructure Productions has assisted with short advertisements for Horrible Imaginings Film Festival.

Filmography

References

External links

Living people
Year of birth missing (living people)
American cinematographers
Screenwriters from California
Film directors from California
People from San Diego